William Garner (born 24 July 1955), also known as Willie Garner is a Scottish former footballer best known for playing for Aberdeen. He is now a manager, mainly of clubs in the junior ranks of Scottish football.

Career
Garner was born in Stirling and raised in Denny; he was a Celtic supporter in childhood. He signed for Aberdeen from Campsie Black Watch in 1975, and was part of the team which won the Scottish League Cup in 1976 and the Scottish Premier Division in 1980, although a broken leg suffered in 1978 had allowed teenager Alex McLeish the opportunity to take the starting place. Garner left Aberdeen in 1981 to join Celtic, but the move was a disappointment for all concerned: he only played two first team games, scored two own goals on his debut and fell behind the emerging David Moyes in the backup list.

He joined Alloa Athletic in 1982 as player-manager aged 27, before returning to Aberdeen in February 1984 to become assistant manager to Alex Ferguson. After two years as Ferguson's number two, during which the club won five major honours, he played for a number of Highland League and Junior clubs before signing for Berwick Rangers, where he remained for two years before retiring in 1992.

Garner was manager of Scottish Junior Football Association, East Region side Ballingry Rovers between October and November 2014, when they folded after 62 years in existence.

Garner has most recently been appointed to the newly formed "Football Monitoring Board" at Aberdeen.This taskforce has been assembled outwith of any AGM, EGM nor was there any public knowledge of such group. Fellow members are Stewart Milne, Dave Cormack and Steven Gunn.

Honours

Aberdeen 
Scottish Premier Division: 1979–80 
Scottish League Cup: 1976–77
Runner-up 1979–80
Scottish Cup: runner-up 1977–78

References

External links
 
Profile at AFC Heritage Trust

Scottish footballers
1955 births
Living people
Footballers from Stirling
Aberdeen F.C. players
Celtic F.C. players
Alloa Athletic F.C. players
Rochdale A.F.C. players
Berwick Rangers F.C. players
Cove Rangers F.C. players
Keith F.C. players
Stoneywood Parkvale F.C. players
Craigroyston F.C. players
Newtongrange Star F.C. players
Scottish Junior Football Association players
Scottish Football League players
English Football League players
Association football central defenders
Scottish football managers
Alloa Athletic F.C. managers
Scottish Football League managers
People from Denny, Falkirk
Association football player-managers
Aberdeen F.C. non-playing staff
Keith F.C. managers
Craigroyston F.C. managers
Newtongrange Star F.C. managers
Harthill Royal F.C. managers
Glenrothes F.C. managers
Tayport F.C. managers
Ballingry Rovers F.C. managers
Scottish Junior Football Association managers
Highland Football League managers
Harthill Royal F.C. non-playing staff